The discography of DC Talk, a Christian music band formed in the late 1980s in Lynchburg, Virginia, consists of five studio albums, three extended plays, and twenty-three singles. The group consists of Toby McKeehan, Kevin Max, and Michael Tait. They began as a hip hop group, but in the mid-90s they reinvented themselves as a pop/rock group. In both instances, they found critical and commercial success in both the Christian music industry as well as the general market.

Studio albums

Live albums

Compilation albums

Extended plays

Singles

Other releases

Original collaborations
Note:  This list is for dc Talk songs not found on dc Talk albums.  Compilation albums (such as the "Wow" series) should not be listed here.  "My Will" and "I Wish We'd All Been Ready" appear here because they were on these albums BEFORE they were on later dc Talk releases.

Vocal appearances
This is a list of songs that include all three members of dc Talk.

Remixed songs
This list is for dc Talk songs that were remixed without involvement from dc Talk, although they are still considered part of dc Talk's official discography.

Audio interviews

Videography

Music videos

Only official dc Talk releases are listed.  Video compilations (such as the "Wow" DVDs) should not be included in this section.

Video appearances

Video contributions and interviews
Note:  This list is for dc Talk songs that were remixed without involvement from dc Talk, although they are still considered part of dc Talk's official discography.

Tributes
2006: Freaked! A Gotee Tribute to dc Talk's Jesus Freak (Gotee Records)

DC Talk: Solo
TobyMac
Tait
Kevin Max
Newsboys (Michael Tait)
Audio Adrenaline (Kevin Max)

Notes

References

Discography
Discographies of American artists
Hip hop discographies
Christian music discographies
Rock music group discographies